Miami Monkey is an American reality television series that premiered on VH1 on September 8, 2013. Developed as the third spin-off of Mob Wives, the series chronicled Angela "Big Ang" Raiola as she opened up a second location of her Staten Island bar.

The show featured Big Ang, her daughter Raquel, and their team of staff that assist in the daily operations.

In May 2013, Raiola confirmed during an interview that a second season of her show Big Ang was being produced, but it was later revealed that the season would be retooled as another spin-off. The series name stems from the name of Ang's bar that opened on May 19, 2013. Raiola moved to Miami for filming in April 2013 with production ending on August 11, 2013.

In July 2014, Raiola confirmed that the show had been canceled.

Cast
Angela "Big Ang" Raiola, main cast member on Mob Wives and Big Ang
 Raquel D'Onofrio, Big Ang's daughter
 Ryan Marisca, a bartender, Raquel's best friend
 Marissa Sabatelli, a waitress, Raquel's best friend
 Roxanne Raiola, manager, married to Big Ang's nephew Ronnie
 Morgan Osman, a bartender, appeared on season five of Bad Girls Club
 Cristina Healion, a bartender
 Nate Ryan, a bartender and DJ
 Gabriella Celestino, a hostess, girlfriend of Big Ang's son AJ

Episodes

References

External links
 
 

2010s American reality television series
2013 American television series debuts
2013 American television series endings
English-language television shows
Television shows set in Miami
VH1 original programming
Reality television spin-offs
Television series by The Weinstein Company
American television spin-offs